Vido William Musso (January 16, 1913 – January 9, 1982) was an American jazz saxophonist.

Biography
Musso moved with his family from Sicily to the U.S. in July 1920, having arrived at the Port of New York on the Italian steamship Patria. They lived in Detroit, where Musso started learning to play clarinet. Ten years later, he went to Los Angeles and formed a big band with Stan Kenton in 1935. Musso dropped out the next year to work with Gus Arnheim, Benny Goodman, and Gene Krupa. He accompanied Billie Holiday and pianist Teddy Wilson on recordings in the late 1930s. He replaced Bunny Berigan as the leader of his band and tried unsuccessfully at other times during the 1930s and 1940s to be a big band leader. But most of his career was spent as a sideman. After returning to Goodman, he was a member of big bands led by Harry James, Woody Herman, and Tommy Dorsey. He went back to play with Kenton during the middle 1940s. Having moved to California, he retired around 1975.

As a leader, Musso recorded for Savoy (1946), Trilon (1947), Arco, Fantasy (1952), RPM, Crown, and Modern.

Discography

As leader
Singles
 "Jig-a-Jive" // "I've Been a Fool" with Betty Van (Davis & Schwegler, 1938)
 "Moose on a Loose" // "Vido in a Jam" (Savoy, 1946) with Kai Winding, Gene Roland, Boots Mussulli
 "Spellbound" // "Lem Me Go" (Savoy, 1946) with the Eddie Safranski All Stars (including Lem Davis)
 "My Jo-Ann" // "Big Deal" (Savoy, 1946)
 "On the Mercury" with the Raye Sisters // "Vido's Bop" (Trilon, 1947)
 "Vido in a Mist"// "Gone with Vido" (Trilon, 1947)
 "Trees" with Ray Wetzel // "The Unfinished Boogie" (Trilon, 1947)
 "The Day I Left Alsace-Lorraine" with the Honeydreamers // "Checkerboard" (Trilon, 1947)
 "Santa Lucia" // "Pagliacci" (Capitol, 1950)
 "Blue Night" // "Vido's Boogie" (RPM, 1953)
 "Vido's Drive" // "Frosty" (RPM, 1953)
 "Blues for Two" // "Speak Easy" (RPM, 1957)
 "Lullaby" // "Roseland Boogie" (Crown, 1953)
 "Musso's Boogie" // "Sing, Sing, Sing" (Crown, 1954)
 "Flat Top Boogie" // "Power House Boogie" (Crown, 1954)

Albums
 Loaded (Savoy, 1956) with Kai Winding, Gene Roland, Boots Mussulli, Eddie Safranski, Denzil Best
 The Swingin'st (Modern, 1956) with Maynard Ferguson, Milt Bernhart
 Teenage Dance Party (Crown, 1957)
 Thanks for the Thrill (Sounds of Yesteryear, 2015)

As sideman
With Wardell Gray
 Way Out Wardell (Modern, 1956)

With Stan Kenton
 Artistry in Rhythm (Capitol, 1950)
 Encores (Capitol, 1950)
 Stan Kenton's Milestones (Capitol, 1950)
 Stan Kenton Classics (Capitol, 1952)
 The Kenton Era (Capitol, 1955)
 Kenton in Hi-Fi (Capitol, 1956)

With Jess Stacy
 Tribute to Benny Goodman (Atlantic, 1954)

References

1913 births
1982 deaths
20th-century American saxophonists
American jazz musicians
American people of Italian descent
Jazz tenor saxophonists
Swing saxophonists
Italian emigrants to the United States
American jazz saxophonists